San Leonardo is a station on Line 1 of the Milan Metro in Milan, Italy. The station was opened on 12 April 1980 as the western terminus of the extension from Lotto to San Leonardo. On 28 September 1986, the line was extended to Molino Dorino. It is located on Via Gaetano Fichera, in the San Leonardo (Gallaratese) district, from which it takes its name. It is an underground station, located within the urban fare limit.

The station has a car park with 333 spaces.

References

Line 1 (Milan Metro) stations
Railway stations opened in 1980
1980 establishments in Italy
Railway stations in Italy opened in the 20th century